Hillary Williams (born October 14, 1988) is an American grappler and Brazilian Jiu-Jitsu practitioner.

Career highlight 
Williams began her Brazilian Jiu-Jitsu career in 2006. With just four years of training she has become a 4-time World Championships Gold Medalist in Brazilian Jiu-Jitsu and a 6-time Pan American Championships Gold Medalist. Williams received her black belt from professors Rolando "The Crazy Cuban" Delgado and Matt Hamilton on June 12, 2010. She only spent seven months and 14 days as a brown belt.

Instructor lineage 
 Jigoro Kano → Tsunejiro Tomita → Mitsuyo Maeda → Carlos Gracie, Sr. → Carlson Gracie → André Pederneiras → Toni Emanuel → Matt Hamilton → Hillary Williams
 Jigoro Kano → Tsunejiro Tomita → Mitsuyo Maeda → Carlos Gracie, Sr. → Carlos "Carlinhos" Gracie Jr. → Diojone Farias → Rolando Delgado → Hillary Williams

Grappling Credentials

Brown/Black Belt 
 06/04/11 - Third - World Championships IBJJF Women's Brown/Black Middleweight
 03/30/11 - Third - Pan Jiu-Jitsu Championships Women's Brown/Black Middleweight
 06/06/10 - First - World Championships IBJJF Women's Brown/Black Middleweight
 05/17/10 - Third - Brazilian Championships Women's Brown Absolute
 05/16/10 - First - Brazilian Championships Women's Brown Middle-Heavyweight
 04/16/10 - Third - World Professional Jiu-Jitsu Cup 2010 Lightweight (-63 kg)
 04/11/10 - First - Pan Jiu-Jitsu Championships Women's Brown/Black Middleweight
 04/10/10 - Third - Pan Jiu-JItsu Championships Women's Brown/Black Absolute
 03/06/10 - First - Arnold's Grappling Women's Nogi Advanced Middleweight
 01/31/10 - First - World Professional Jiu-Jitsu Cup 2010 Trials [East Coast] Lightweight
 11/08/09 - First - Mundial Nogi Brown/Black Women's Middleweight
 11/08/09 - First - Mundial Nogi Brown/Black Women's Absolute

Purple Belt 
 09/26/09 - Third - ADCC World Championships Women's <60 kg
 07/18/09 – First – Mundial CBJJE Women's Purple Belt Middle Weight
 07/18/09 – First – Mundial CBJJE Women's Purple Belt Absolute
 06/22/09 – First – Sulamericano Women's Purple Belt Middle Weight
 06/22/09 – First – Sulamericano Women's Purple Belt Absolute
 06/06/09 – First – World Championships Women's Middle Weight Purple Belt
 05/23/09 – First – ADCC North American Trials Lightweight
 03/28/09 - First - Pan Jiu-JItsu Championships Women's Purple Belt Absolute
 03/28/09 - First - Pan Jiu-JItsu Championships Women's Purple Belt Middleweight
 03/07/09 - Winner - Titan Grappling Challenge Gi Superfight
 02/28/09 - Winner - Russellville Fight Night Nogi Superfight 
 02/21/09 - Second - Hayastan Grappling Challenge Men's Int/Adv Lightweight
 10/05/08 - First - Pan Nogi Women's Blue/Purple Middleweight 
 09/13/08 - First - NAGA Atlanta Women's Nogi Advanced Absolute 
 08/16/08 - First - NAGA Dallas Women's Nogi Advanced Heavyweight
 08/02/08 - First - Dominion Grappling Championships Women's Pro Nogi Invitational
 08/02/08 - First - Dominion Grappling Championships Women's Purple Belt Absolute
 05/24/08 - First - ADCC Regional Tampa Women's Advanced
 05/24/08 - Second - ADCC Regional Tampa Men's Advanced Lightweight
 05/03/08 - First - Dollamur Grappling Championships Women's Advanced Open NoGi
 05/03/08 - First - Dollamur Grappling Championships Women's Advanced Open Gi

Blue Belt 
 04/19/08 - First - NAGA Virginia Women's Advanced Open NoGi
 04/19/08 - First - NAGA Virginia Women's Advanced Open Gi
 03/28/08 - First - Pan Jiu-JItsu Championships Women's Blue Belt Middleweight
 03/01/08 - Second - Arnold's Classic NAGA Women's Advanced Gi
 03/01/08 - First - Arnold's Classic NAGA Women's Advanced Lightweight No Gi
 03/01/08 - First - Arnold's Classic NAGA Women's Advanced Middleweight No Gi
 02/23/08 - Second - Subzero Grappling Men's Featherweight Intermediate No Gi
 02/09/08 - First - Winter Wars Women's Open Blue Belt 
 01/26/08 - Third - Shoothook Submission Tournament Men's <155 Intermediate NoGi 
 12/01/07 - First - NAGA Ohio Men's Featherweight Blue Belt
 12/01/07 - First - NAGA Ohio Women's Open Blue Belt
 12/01/07 - First - NAGA Ohio Women's Advanced Open No Gi
 12/01/07 - First - NAGA Ohio Women's Intermediate Open No Gi
 10/06/07 - Winner - Ring Rulers MMA Fights & Grappling Superfight
 06/30/07 - First - Elite Grappler's Championships Women's Absolute Gi
 06/30/07 - First - Elite Grappler's Championships Women's Open Blue belt
 06/23/07 - Third - Shoothook Submission Tournament Men's Lightweight NoGi
 06/23/07 - First - Shoothook Submission Tournament Women's Open NoGi
 06/09/07 - First - NAGA Nationals Lightweight Women's Blue Belt
 06/09/07 - First - NAGA Nationals Lightweight Women's Intermediate No Gi
 06/02/07 - First - Elite MAA Grappling Tournament Women's No Gi

White Belt 
 03/30/07 - First - Pan Jiu-JItsu Championships Women's Lightweight White belt
 02/25/07 - First - Elite MAA Grappling Tournament Women's Open No Gi
 11/11/06 - First - Submission Sport Open Women's Beginner No-Gi
 11/11/06 - First - Submission Sport Open Women's Whitebelt
 06/08/06 - First - Elite Grappler's Lightweight Women's White belt

References

External links
 Official Website
 Hillary Williams on YouTube
 

1988 births
Living people
American practitioners of Brazilian jiu-jitsu
World No-Gi Brazilian Jiu-Jitsu Championship medalists
Brazilian jiu-jitsu world champions (women)